Marcus Spring (October 21, 1810 – August 22, 1874) was, with his wife Rebecca Buffum Spring, the creator of the Raritan Bay Union, a utopian community in Perth Amboy, New Jersey.

Early life
He was born in Northbridge, Massachusetts, in 1810 to Adolphus Spring (1772–1847) and Lydia Taft (1772–1838) and attended Uxbridge Academy. In 1831 he moved to New York City and was a cotton merchant. He married Rebecca Buffum (1812–1911), a wealthy Quaker, on October 16, 1836. The Springs were the traveling companions of feminist author Margaret Fuller during Fuller's tour of Europe in 1846 and 1847.

Career
Around 1850 he became a stockholder in the North American Phalanx in Red Bank, New Jersey. He started the Raritan Bay Union, as a utopian community in 1853. It closed in 1860 and he started the Eagleswood Military Academy in 1861. His son was Edward Adolphus Spring, a sculptor.

Archive
NJHS: Raritan Bay Union and Eagleswood Military Academy Papers, 1809-1923

References

New York Times; August 22, 1874; Obituary; Marcus Spring
Richard C. S. Trahair; Utopias and Utopians: An Historical Dictionary 

1810 births
1874 deaths
Founders of utopian communities
People from Northbridge, Massachusetts
People from Perth Amboy, New Jersey
People from Uxbridge, Massachusetts